Madhyamgram is a city and a municipality of North 24 Parganas district in the Indian state of West Bengal. It is close to Kolkata and also a part of the area covered by Kolkata Metropolitan Development Authority (KMDA).

History

Madhyamgram was one of the twelve feudal provinces of Bengal. It was under Pratapaditya Roy, ruler of Jessore during the Mughal Empire.

On 21 December 1757 Mir Jafar, the Nawab of Bengal, presented twenty-four parganas to the East India Company as dowry which also included Madhyamgram, under Anwarpur Pargana, adjacent to Barasat.

The first railway line from Madhyamgram to Duttapukur was commissioned in 1882 and the station was called Chandipur. Madhyamgram was then named as Majher Gaon, probably because the area was situated between Badu (Chakradharpur Mouza) and Sajirhat (Guchuria Mouza).

The present narrow Noai Canal, now acting as a dividing border line between New Barrackpore and Madhyamgram, stretching from the South of Ganganagar to Sajirhat in the West used to be a wide river, once called Labanyabati, which through colloquial transformation became the Noai River, and after years of silt depositions, turned into Noai Canal.

At that time, Anwarpur Pargana was notable for its tobacco trade and a special sweet-smelling blended tobacco was manufactured in Madhyamgram.

Madhyamgram was also a big paddy growing area, and the Labanya River was a medium of navigation for the exportation of those products. Madhyamgram was also notable for its fine embroidery works that attracted appreciation from Delhi and Mumbai. Many Muslim families maintained a livelihood through those works.

Geography

Location
Madhyamgram is bounded by Barasat II in the east; Barasat II, Rajarhat (community development block), Bidhannagar Municipal Corporation and North Dum Dum in the south; New Barrackpore and Barrackpore II in the west and Barasat in the north.

Area overview
The area covered in the map alongside is largely a part of the north Bidyadhari Plain. located in the lower Ganges Delta. The country is flat. It is a little raised above flood level and the highest ground borders the river channels.54.67% of the people of the densely populated area lives in the urban areas and 45.33% lives in the rural  areas.

Note: The map alongside presents some of the notable locations in the subdivision. All places marked in the map are linked in the larger full screen map.

Climate
The climate is tropical, like the rest of the Gangetic West Bengal. The hallmark season is the Monsoon—which occurs from early June to mid September. The weather remains dry during the winter (mid-November to mid-February) and humid during summer.

Temperature: 41 °C in May (max) and 8.3 °C in January (min).

Demographics

Population
According to the 2011 Census of India, Madhyamgram had a total population of 196,127, of which 98,864 were males and 97,263 were females. Population in the age range 0 to 6 years was 16,351. The total number of literate persons in Madhyamgram was 161,087. The effective literacy (7+) of population over 6 years of age was 89.60%. The Scheduled Castes and Scheduled Tribes population was 24,822 and 2,842 respectively. Madhyamgram had a total of 48942 households as of 2011.

As of the 2001 Indian census, Madhyamgram had a population of 198,964. Males constitute 51% of the population and females 49%. Madhyamgram has an average literacy rate of 76%, higher than the national average of 59.5%: male literacy is 80% and female literacy is 71%. In Madhyamgram, 10% of the population is under 6 years of age.

Kolkata Urban Agglomeration
The following Municipalities and Census Town in Barasat Sadar subdivision were part of Kolkata Urban Agglomeration in the 2011 census: Barasat (M), Madhyamgram (M), Rajarhat-Gopalpur (M) (merged with Bidhannagar Municipal Corporation in 2015) and Raigachhi (CT).

Administration

Police station
Madhyamgram police station serves a population of 198,964. It has jurisdiction over Madhyamgram Municipal area and Barasat II CD Block.

Economy

There is a major textile mill and a rubber factory in this area. Star Mall is located in Madhyamgram on Jessore Road. The mall was launched in 2008 and has a gross leasable area of 237,000 sqft.

Transport
Madhyamgram is characterised by its close proximity to an airport (Kolkata Airport) (around 15 minutes). Madhyamgram is a four-point junction of Jessore Road (part of State Highway 12), Sodepur-Barasat Road and Badu Road. East and west parts of Madhyamgram are connected with a Rail Overbridge (Madhyamgram Bridge), which was opened in 2006.

Many private and governmental public buses serve the town. Taxi services are one of the most popular forms of transportion to reach nearby towns like Sodepur, New Barrackpore and Barasat. Rickshaws, three-wheeled pedalled vans and battery-operated e-rickshaws ("toto" vans) are also used for short distances.

Madhyamgram railway station on the Sealdah–Hasnabad–Bangaon–Ranaghat line serves the town.

Education
Vivekananda College is a degree college in Madhyamgram. The engineering college Camellia Institute of Technology and the management college Camellia School Of Business Management are also located here.

Sports

Madhyamgram High School has won the Subroto Cup, an all-India inter-school soccer competition, seven times, which includes a hat-trick (in the years 1981, 1982 and 1983).

References

External links

Cities and towns in North 24 Parganas district
Kolkata Metropolitan Area
Neighbourhoods in Kolkata
Cities in West Bengal